This is a list of notable Italian Australians.

Musicians

Vanessa Amorosi – singer, entertainer
Tina Arena – singer, entertainer
Christian Argenti – singer
Anthony Callea – singer, entertainer
Emmanuel Carella – singer
Nic Cester – singer-songwriter
Gabriella Cilmi – singer
Cosima De Vito – singer
Joe Dolce – singer
Bella Ferraro – singer
Anthony Field – songwriter, producer
Natalie Gauci – singer
Laura Imbruglia – singer
Natalie Imbruglia – singer, entertainer and actress 
Paul Kelly – singer
Rachael Leahcar – singer
Raffaele Marcellino – composer
Indiana Massara – singer, model and actress
Silvie Paladino – singer
Giselle Rosselli – singer
Reginald Alberto Agrati Stoneham (1879–1942) – composer; veteran of the Boer War
Richard Tognetti – violinist, composer and leader of the Australian Chamber Orchestra
The Veronicas – singers

Actors and entertainers
Jason Agius (born 1984) – actor
Joe Avati (born 1974) – comedian
Steve Bastoni (born 1966) – actor
Natasha Liu Bordizzo (born 1994) – actress
Richard Brancatisano (born 1983) – actor
Scott Cam (born 1962) – presenter and actor
Rachael Carpani (born 1980) – actress
Santo Cilauro (born 1962) – comedian
Diane Cilento (1932–2011) – actress
Salvatore Coco (born 1975) – actor
Vince Colosimo (born 1966) – actor
Claudia Doumit (born 1992) – actress
Leila George (born 1992) – actress
Isabella Giovinazzo (born 1990) – actress
Anthony LaPaglia (born 1959) – actor
Jonathan LaPaglia (born 1969) – actor
Marco Leonardi (born 1971) – actor 
Chas Licciardello (born 1977) – political satirist
Paul Mercurio (born 1963) – actor
Dina Panozzo – actress
Oriana Panozzo (born 1959) – actress
Danny Raco (born 1979) – actor and director
Vince Sorrenti (born 1961) – comedian

Arts
Mario Andreacchio – director
Felice Arena – author
Santo Cilauro – producer and screenwriter 
Giorgio Mangiamele – filmmaker
Melina Marchetta – author
Patricia Piccinini – artist
Pietro Porcelli – sculptor
Tahyna Tozzi – director, writer and producer
Paul Zanetti – political cartoonist
Salvatore Zofrea – artist

Journalists

Emma Alberici – ABC journalist
Christian Argenti – broadcaster
Mark Beretta – sports journalist
Paul Bongiorno – political journalist
Jane Gazzo – broadcaster and music journalist
Robert Grasso – SBS sports journalist
Steve Pizzati – Top Gear presenter
Michelangelo Rucci – sports writer
Virginia Trioli – journalist

Law
Bernard Bongiorno – Victorian Supreme Court Judge

Models
Stefania Ferrario – model & activist

Sciences & Health
Raphael Cilento – medical practitioner & public health administrator

Business people

James del Piano – immigration, shipping, real estate, timber; president of the Western Australian Italian Club (1947–1965); City of Perth councillor for ten years, including two years as Deputy Lord Mayor

Politics
Anthony Albanese – Prime Minister of Australia and Leader of the Federal Labor Party, former Deputy Prime Minister of Australia (ALP)
Franca Arena – former NSW state politician (ALP) 
Lidia Argondizzo – Victorian state politician (ALP)
John Barilaro – former deputy premier of NSW
Phil Barresi – Federal politician (Liberal)
Cory Bernardi – Federal Senator (Liberal)
Tony Buti – Western Australian state politician (ALP)
Raffaello Carboni – honorary membership due to his involvement in the Eureka Stockade 1854
Carlo Carli – Victorian state politician (ALP)
Nick Catania – WA former state politician (ALP)
Vince Catania – WA state politician (ALP) until July 2009, WA Nationals from July 2009
Vincenzina (Vini) Ciccarello – South Australian state politician (ALP)
Raff Ciccone – Federal Labor Senator for Victoria
David Crisafulli – Queensland state Opposition Leader (Liberal)
Lily D'Ambrosio – Victorian state politician (ALP)
Angela D'Amore – Member of the New South Wales Legislative Assembly (ALP)
Richard Di Natale – former federal Senator and Leader of the Greens
John D'Orazio – WA former state politician (ALP) then independent
Concetta Fierravanti-Wells – Federal Senator (Liberal)
James Gobbo – Governor of Victoria (1997–2000)
Morris Iemma – former Premier of New South Wales (ALP)
Licia Kokocinski – former Victorian upper house politician (ALP)
Tony Luchetti – former federal politician (ALP)
Nola Marino – Federal politician (Liberal)
James Merlino – 27th Deputy Premier of Victoria (ALP)
Sandra Nori – former NSW state politician (ALP)
Paul Omodei – Western Australian state opposition leader (Liberal)
George Paciullo – former NSW politician (ALP)
Paul Papalia – Western Australian state politician (ALP)
John Pasquarelli – former advisor to the Australian politician and One Nation leader Pauline Hanson
John Pesutto – Victorian state politician (Liberal)
Sam Piantadosi – former Western Australian state politician
Rita Saffioti – Western Australian state politician (ALP)
B. A. Santamaria – political activist and journalist
Santo Santoro – former federal senator (Liberal)
Frank Sartor – NSW state politician (ALP)
Con Sciacca – Federal politician (ALP)
Giovanni Sgro – Victorian politician (ALP)
John Sidoti – Member of the New South Wales Legislative Assembly (LIB)
Joe Tripodi – NSW politician (ALP)
Tony Vallelonga – former mayor of the City of Stirling in Western Australia

Religion
 Filippo Bernardini – Apostolic Delegate
 Bonaventura Cerretti – Apostolic Delegate
 Paolo Marella – Apostolic Delegate
 Giovanni Panico – Apostolic Delegate
 Anthony Randazzo – Catholic bishop
Louisa Angelina Santospirito – Catholic laywoman, welfare worker
 Elzear Torreggiani – Catholic bishop

Sport

Australian rules football
Steven Alessio
Mark Arceri
Ron Barassi
Ron Barassi Sr.
Peter Bevilaqua
Marcus Bontempelli
Scott Camporeale
Blake Caracella
Andrew Carrazzo
Domenic Cassisi
Vin Catoggio
Reece Conca
Stephen Coniglio
Stewart Crameri
Frank Curcio
Nick Dal Santo
Brett Deledio
Paul Dimattina
Robert DiPierdomenico – Brownlow Medallist
Alec Epis
Orazio Fantasia
Brendan Fevola
Aaron Fiora
Michael Firrito
Anthony Franchina
Daniel Giansiracusa
Brent Guerra
Josh Kelly
Anthony Koutoufides
Andrew Leoncelli
Tom Liberatore
Tony Liberatore – Brownlow Medallist
Paul Licuria
Peter Matera
Mark Mercuri
Joe Misiti
Leigh Montagna
Angelo Petraglia
Marc Pittonet
Simon Prestigiacomo
Paul Puopolo
Peter Riccardi
Mark Ricciuto – Brownlow Medallist
Guy Rigoni 
Michael Rischitelli
Anthony Rocca
Saverio Rocca
Jack Silvagni
Sergio Silvagni 
Stephen Silvagni – AFL Team of the Century
Tim Taranto
Andrew Tranquilli

Soccer

Paul Agostino – soccer
John Aloisi – soccer
Melissa Barbieri – soccer
Daniel Beltrame – soccer
Arno Bertogna – soccer
Peter Bevilaqua – soccer
Mark Birighitti – soccer
Brandon Borrello – soccer
Raphael Bove – soccer
Mark Bresciano – soccer
Joshua Brillante – soccer
John Buonavoglia – soccer
Joe Caletti – soccer
Alvin Ceccoli – soccer
Joel Chianese – soccer
Simon Colosimo – soccer
Steve Corica – Sydney FC
Angelo Costanzo – Adelaide City
Fausto De Amicis – soccer
Lisa De Vanna – soccer
Anthony Di Pietro – soccer Chairman of Melbourne Victory FC
Andrew Durante – soccer
Frank Farina – soccer
Adam Federici – Reading England
Matthew Foschini – soccer, Melbourne Victory
Ben Garuccio – soccer 
Vince Grella – soccer
Patrick Kisnorbo - soccer
Paul Kohler – soccer
Jacob Italiano – soccer
Paul Izzo – soccer
Vince Lia – Wellington Phoenix
Massimo Luongo – footballer, Swindon Town
Michael Marrone – soccer
Sergio Melta – Adelaide City
Paul Okon – Marconi 
Sebastian Pasquali – Melbourne Victory
John Perin – Adelaide City
Tony Pignata – soccer CEO of Sydney FC
Hayley Raso – soccer
Christian Signorelli – soccer
Lou Sticca – FIFA player and match agent
Danny Tiatto – soccer
Paul Trimboli – soccer
James Troisi – soccer
Carl Valeri – soccer
Roberto Venturato – coach of A.S. Cittadella
Aurelio Vidmar – Adelaide City
Tony Vidmar – Adelaide city
Max Vieri – soccer
Robert Zabica – soccer
Andrew Zinni – Brunswick Juventus
Michael Zullo – soccer

Rugby league
Tas Baitieri – Australian rugby league footballer
Martin Bella – Australian rugby league footballer
Terry Campese – Australian rugby league footballer
Willie Carne – Australian rugby league footballer
Cameron Ciraldo – Australian rugby league footballer
Jake Clifford – Australian rugby league footballer
Mark Corvo – Australian rugby league footballer
Luke Davico – Australian rugby league footballer
Paul Dezolt – Australian rugby league footballer
Shannon Donato – Australian rugby league footballer
Greg Florimo – Australian rugby league footballer
Paul Franze – Australian rugby league footballer
Craig Gower – Australian rugby league footballer
Tony Grimaldi – Australian rugby league footballer
Aiden Guerra – Australian rugby league footballer
Anthony Laffranchi – Australian rugby league footballer
Joshua Mantellato – Australian rugby league footballer
Ciriaco Mescia – Australian rugby league footballer
Anthony Minichiello – Australian rugby league footballer
Mark Minichiello – Australian rugby league footballer
Chris Nero – Australian rugby league footballer
Shane Rigon – Australian rugby league footballer
Grant Rovelli – Australian rugby league footballer
Craig Salvatori – Australian rugby league footballer
Dean Schifilliti – Australian rugby league footballer
Kade Snowden – Australian rugby league footballer
Laurie Spina – Australian rugby league footballer
James Tedesco – Australian rugby league footballer
Paul Vaughan – Australian rugby league footballer
Nick Zisti – Australian Rugby league footballer

Rugby union
David Campese – Australian rugby union player
Paul Carozza – Australian rugby union player
Matt Carraro – Australian rugby union player
John Eales – Australian rugby union team captain (Italian-Australian mother)
Scott Fava – Australian rugby union player
Luke McLean – rugby union player for the Italian national team (Italian-Australian mother) 
Matt Pini – Australian rugby union player
Julian Salvi – Australian rugby union player
Rudi Vedelago – Australian rugby union player

Cricket
Don Bradman
Joe Burns
Michael Dimattina
Michael Di Venuto
Phillip Hughes 
Olivia Magno
Sharon Millanta
Luke Ronchi
Joe Scuderi
Mike Veletta
Elyse Villani
Adam Zampa

Other sports
Claire Bevilacqua – surfer
Tully Bevilaqua – basketball player
Dean Capobianco – runner
Martin Cattalini – basketball player
Al Costello – professional wrestler
Casey Dellacqua – tennis player
Matthew Dellavedova – NBA basketballer
Tommaso D'Orsogna – swimmer
Rocky Gattellari – boxer
Frank Giorgi – kickboxer
Chris Guccione – tennis player
Rocky Mattioli – boxer
Mario Milano – professional wrestler
Mark Occhilupo – world surfing champion
Vic Patrick - Victor Patrick Lucca – boxer
Mark Philippoussis – tennis player
Daniel Ricciardo – racing
Massimiliano Rosolino – swimmer

References 

Italian
 
A
Italian